Rothschild's giraffe (Giraffa camelopardalis rothschildi) is a subspecies of the Northern giraffe. It is one of the most endangered distinct populations of giraffe, with 1,399 mature individuals estimated in the wild in 2018.

Taxonomy and evolutionary history 

The IUCN currently recognizes only one species of giraffe with nine subspecies. Giraffa camelopardalis rothschildi is named after the Tring Museum's founder, Walter Rothschild, and is also known as the Baringo giraffe, after the Lake Baringo area of Kenya, or as the Ugandan giraffe. All of those living in the wild are in protected areas in Kenya and Uganda. In 2007, Rothschild's giraffe was proposed as a separate species from other giraffe. In 2016, Rothschild's giraffe was proposed as conspecific with the Nubian giraffe (elevated to full species), but that taxonomy has not been widely adopted.

Characteristics 
The Rothschild's giraffe is easily distinguishable from other subspecies. The most obvious sign is in the coloring of the coat or pelt. Whereas the reticulated giraffe has very clearly defined dark patches with bright-whitish channels between them, Rothschild's giraffe more closely resembles the Masai giraffe. However, when compared to the Masai giraffe, the Rothschild's ecotype is paler, the orange-brown patches are less jagged and sharp in shape, and the connective channel is of a creamier hue compared to that seen on the reticulated giraffe. In addition, Rothschild's giraffe displays no markings on the lower leg, giving it the impression of wearing white stockings.

Another distinguishing feature of Rothschild's giraffe, although harder to spot, is the number of ossicones on the head. This is the only Giraffa phenotype to be born with five ossicones. Two of these are the larger and more obvious ones at the top of the head, which are common to all giraffes. The third ossicone can often be seen in the center of the giraffe's forehead, and the other two are behind each ear. They can weigh up to 2,500 pounds.

Males are larger than females by a few hundred pounds and their two largest ossicones are usually bald from sparring. They usually tend to be darker in colour than the females, although this is not a guaranteed sexing indicator.

Habitat and distribution 
Isolated populations of Rothschild's giraffes live in savannahs, grasslands, and open woodlands of Uganda and Kenya. They are possibly regionally extinct from South Sudan and northeastern Democratic Republic of the Congo.

Ecology and behavior 
Rothschild's giraffes mate at any time of the year and have a gestation period of 14 to 16 months, typically giving birth to a single calf. They live in small herds, with males and females (and their calves) living separately, only mixing for mating. The Rothschild's giraffes are tolerant of other animals around them as long as they don't feel threatened. For the most part, they are very friendly, but the males are known to engage in fights for mating. Since this species can mate all year long, those battles seem to be frequent.

Threats and conservation 
As of 2018, Rothschild's giraffe is classified as near threatened. Very few locations are left where Rothschild's giraffe can be seen in the wild, with notable spots being Lake Nakuru National Park in Kenya and Murchison Falls National Park in northern Uganda. Their predators are hyenas, lions, crocodiles, and leopards.

Scientists speculate their dwarfism may have been caused by inbreeding due to species decline.

Three Rothschild's giraffes were electrocuted by low-hanging power lines in Soysambu conservancy in Nakuru, Kenya.

In captivity 
Various captive breeding programmes are in place – notably at the Giraffe Centre in Nairobi, Kenya – which aim to expand the gene pool in the wild population of Rothschild's giraffe. , more than 450 are kept in ISIS (international species information system) registered zoos (which does not include the Nairobi Giraffe Centre), making both it and the reticulated giraffe the most commonly kept phenotypes of Giraffa.

References

External links 
 
 

Rothschild's giraffe
Mammals of Kenya
Mammals of South Sudan
Mammals of Uganda
Endangered fauna of Africa
Rothschild's giraffe
Taxa named by Walter Rothschild
Subspecies